Den kulørte Slavehandler  is a 1914 Danish silent film directed by Lau Lauritzen Sr. on his debut as a film director.

Cast
Johanne Fritz-Petersen ...  Alice 
Johannes Meyer ...  Professor Hasse 
Johannes Ring ...  Fabrikant Schultze 
Carl Schenstrøm ...  Prins Gera 
Christian Schrøder ...  Tom Bruce 
Torben Meyer
Birger von Cotta-Schønberg 
Vita Blichfeldt 
Mathilde Felumb-Friis

External links

Danish Film Institute

1914 films
Danish silent films
Films directed by Lau Lauritzen Sr.
Danish black-and-white films
1914 directorial debut films